
Lac de Lona is a lake at an elevation of 2640 m above Grimentz, in the canton of Valais, Switzerland.

See also
List of mountain lakes of Switzerland

Lona